Modzerowo  is a village in the administrative district of Gmina Izbica Kujawska, within Włocławek County, Kuyavian-Pomeranian Voivodeship, in north-central Poland.

The village has a population of 180.

Catholical Church
In Modzerowo is historic, wooden church of St. Stanislaus Bishop and Martyr, from 1591. There is also a Roman Catholic cemetery.

References

Modzerowo